Landers Nolley II (born March 5, 2000) is an American college basketball player for the Cincinnati Bearcats of the American Athletic Conference (AAC). He previously played for the Memphis Tigers and the Virginia Tech Hokies.

Early life and high school career
Nolley learned to play basketball from his father, also named Landers Nolley, who played college basketball for LSU. He trained with his father every day. In his sophomore season, Nolley averaged 17 points per game for Curie Metropolitan High School in Chicago and helped his team win a Class 4A state championship. As a junior, he transferred to Langston Hughes High School in Fairburn, Georgia. Nolley averaged 25 points and seven rebounds per game in his first year with his team. He scored 26 points to lead Langston Hughes to its first Georgia 6A state title. 

In his senior season, Nolley averaged 31 points, eight rebounds, and three assists per game, helping his team defend the Georgia 6A championship. He posted 34 points, 10 rebounds, and six assists in the finals. Nolley was named Atlanta Journal-Constitution Player of the Year and USA Today Georgia Player of the Year. He also earned All-State honors and left as his school's all-time leading scorer. Nolley was a consensus four-star recruit and top-100 prospect in the 2018 class. On October 15, 2017, one week after committing to play college basketball for Georgia, he switched his commitment to Virginia Tech.

College career

Virginia Tech
Nolley was forced to sit out his freshman season due to the NCAA reviewing his academic eligibility. While he sat on the bench, Virginia Tech finished 26–9 and reached the Sweet 16 of the NCAA Tournament. After the season, the Hokies' top five scorers and coach Buzz Williams departed, but Nolley announced he was staying at Virginia Tech and had no intention of transferring. Nolley scored 30 points including four three-pointers in his debut for the Hokies, a 67–60 win over Clemson. After scoring 27 points against Lehigh and 23 points against USC Upstate, Nolley was named Atlantic Coast Conference freshman of the week on November 18, 2019. He had 22 points in a 71–66 upset of number 3-ranked Michigan State on November 25, hitting a crucial three-pointer with under a minute to go. At the conclusion of the regular season, Nolley was selected to the ACC All-Freshman Team and was Honorable Mention All-Conference. He averaged 15.5 points and 5.8 rebounds per game. After the season, he announced he was transferring from Virginia Tech.

Memphis
On April 20, 2020, Nolley announced on Twitter that he would continue his career at Memphis, choosing the Tigers over Georgia and Ole Miss. Nolley was granted a waiver for immediate eligibility on August 27, 2020. He averaged 13.1 points, 4.1 rebounds and 1.8 assists per game as a redshirt sophomore. Nolley was named MVP of the NIT, helping the Tigers win the championship.

The following year, Nolley was fourth for the Tigers in scoring, averaging 9.8 PPG, and helped lead the team to their first NCAA appearance since 2014. After the season, Nolley entered the transfer portal.

Cincinnati
After having visits to NC State and Texas A&M, Nolley committed to Cincinnati on April 27, 2022.

Career statistics

College

|-
| style="text-align:left;"| 2018–19
| style="text-align:left;"| Virginia Tech
| style="text-align:center;" colspan="11"|  Redshirt
|-
| style="text-align:left;"| 2019–20
| style="text-align:left;"| Virginia Tech
| 32 || 29 || 30.2 || .370 || .316 || .780 || 5.8 || 2.4 || 0.8 || 0.3 || 15.5
|-
| style="text-align:left;"| 2020–21
| style="text-align:left;"| Memphis
| 28 || 25 || 27.4 || .415 || .387 || .803 || 4.1 || 1.8 || 1.1 || 0.2 || 13.1
|-
| style="text-align:left;"| 2021–22
| style="text-align:left;"| Memphis
| 29 || 18 || 26.6 || .380 || .336 || .795 || 3.9 || 2.8 || 0.9 || 0.3 || 9.8
|-
| style="text-align:left;"| 2022–23
| style="text-align:left;"| Cincinnati
| 34 || 34 || 32.0 || .453 || .419 || .750 || 5.8 || 2.6 || 1.0 || 0.4 || 16.6
|- class="sortbottom"
| style="text-align:center;" colspan="2"| Career
| 123 || 106 || 29.2 || .406 || .367 || .778 || 4.9 || 2.4 || 0.9 || 0.3 || 13.9

References

External links
Memphis Tigers bio
Virginia Tech Hokies bio

2000 births
Living people
American men's basketball players
Basketball players from Atlanta
Memphis Tigers men's basketball players
Small forwards
Virginia Tech Hokies men's basketball players